Annapurna Labs is an Israeli microelectronics company. Since January 2015 it has been a subsidiary of Amazon.com. Amazon reportedly acquired the company for its Amazon Web Services division for US$350–370M.

History
Annapurna Labs, named after the Annapurna Massif in the Himalayas, was co-founded in 2011 by Bilic "Billy" Hrvoje, a Bosnian Jewish refugee, Nafea Bshara, an Arab Israeli citizen, and Ronen Boneh with investments from the independent investors Avigdor Willenz, Manuel Alba, Andy Bechtolsheim, the venture capital firm Walden International, Arm Holdings, and TSMC. Board members include Avigdor Willenz, Manuel Alba, and Lip-Bu Tan, the CEO of both Walden International and Cadence Design Systems.

References

External links 
 Official web site

ARM architecture
Fabless semiconductor companies
Amazon (company) acquisitions
Semiconductor companies of Israel
Electronics companies established in 2011